Las Lomas (Spanish for 'The Hills') is an unincorporated community and census-designated place (CDP) in Monterey County, California, United States. The population was 3,046 at the 2020 census.

History
The town was formerly known as "Hall".

Prior to 1981, the community suffered from grave water contamination and public health problems. Sanitary sewers for the entire area were installed in 1981-82 due to federal grants secured by then Monterey County Supervisor Marc Del Piero.

Geography
Las Lomas is located in northern Monterey County on County Route G12 between Prunedale and Pajaro. The Elkhorn Slough, a  tidal slough and estuary that flows out in Monterey Bay, is just south of the community.

Demographics

2010
At the 2010 census Las Lomas had a population of 3,024. The racial makeup of Las Lomas was 1,167 (38.6%) White, 37 (1.2%) African American, 93 (3.1%) Native American, 53 (1.8%) Asian, 24 (0.8%) Pacific Islander, 1,490 (49.3%) from other races, and 160 (5.3%) from two or more races. Hispanic or Latino of any race were 2,696 persons (89.2%).

The whole population lived in households, no one lived in non-institutionalized group quarters and no one was institutionalized.

There were 598 households, 393 (65.7%) had children under the age of 18 living in them, 415 (69.4%) were opposite-sex married couples living together, 69 (11.5%) had a female householder with no husband present, 47 (7.9%) had a male householder with no wife present.  There were 35 (5.9%) unmarried opposite-sex partnerships, and 4 (0.7%) same-sex married couples or partnerships. 42 households (7.0%) were one person and 9 (1.5%) had someone living alone who was 65 or older. The average household size was 5.06.  There were 531 families (88.8% of households); the average family size was 5.13.

The age distribution was 1,001 people (33.1%) under the age of 18, 368 people (12.2%) aged 18 to 24, 900 people (29.8%) aged 25 to 44, 560 people (18.5%) aged 45 to 64, and 195 people (6.4%) who were 65 or older.  The median age was 27.7 years. For every 100 females, there were 111.2 males.  For every 100 females age 18 and over, there were 112.3 males.

There were 623 housing units at an average density of 600.8 per square mile, of the occupied units 368 (61.5%) were owner-occupied and 230 (38.5%) were rented. The homeowner vacancy rate was 1.1%; the rental vacancy rate was 2.5%.  1,875 people (62.0% of the population) lived in owner-occupied housing units and 1,149 people (38.0%) lived in rental housing units.

2000
At the 2000 census there were 3,078 people, 584 households, and 522 families in the CDP. The racial makeup of the CDP was 48.86% White, 0.81% African American, 1.40% Native American, 1.40% Asian, 0.23% Pacific Islander, 43.96% from other races, and 3.35% from two or more races. Hispanic or Latino of any race were 83.92%.

Of the 584 households 57.0% had children under the age of 18 living with them, 69.2% were married couples living together, 13.2% had a female householder with no husband present, and 10.6% were non-families. 6.8% of households were one person and 2.6% were one person aged 65 or older.  The average household size was 5.26 and the average family size was 5.37.

The age distribution was 35.6% under the age of 18, 12.9% from 18 to 24, 31.7% from 25 to 44, 14.5% from 45 to 64, and 5.4% 65 or older.  The median age was 26 years. For every 100 females, there were 107.1 males.  For every 100 females age 18 and over, there were 105.2 males.

The median household income was $48,802 and the median family income  was $49,293. Males had a median income of $27,778 versus $27,813 for females. The per capita income for the CDP was $10,689.  About 9.8% of families and 8.8% of the population were below the poverty line, including 10.5% of those under age 18 and 7.1% of those age 65 or over.

References

Census-designated places in Monterey County, California
Census-designated places in California